Etty Fraser Martins de Souza (8 May 1931 – 31 December 2018) was a Brazilian actress.

Predominantly a stage actress, Fraser presented a culinary program called À Moda da Casa in the 1980s on Rede Bandeirantes and later TV Record.

In 1992 Etty Fraser converted from Judaism to Roman Catholicism. She was baptized, confirmed and married into the Roman Catholic Church.

Works on TV
 1959 - Grande Teatro Tupi
 1961 - O Vigilante Rodoviário
 1962 - Pequenos Burgueses
 1966 - Ninguém Crê em Mim 
 1968 - Beto Rockfeller.... Madame Walesca
 1969 - Nino, o Italianinho.... Adelaide
 1970 - Simplesmente Maria....  Pierina
 1972 - Vitória Bonelli.... Pina (Hipólita) 
 1974 - O Machão.... Mimosa
 1975 - Meu Rico Português.... Frida
 1976 - Os Apóstolos de Judas.... Evelyn
 1978 - Salário Mínimo.... Letícia
 1980 - Cavalo Amarelo.... Elisa
 1980 - Dulcinéa vai à guerra.... Elisa
 1987 - Sassaricando.... Felícia
 1992 - Mundo da Lua.... Tia Yolanda
 1998 - Torre de Babel.... Sarita
 2001 - Entre o Amor e a Espada
 2004 - Um Só Coração.... Ita
 2006 - Cidadão Brasileiro.... Mariazinha
 2010 - Uma Rosa com Amor.... Antonieta

Works in film
1965 - São Paulo, Sociedade Anônima
1967 - O Alegre Mundo de Helo
1969 - O Agente da Lei
1970 - Em Cada Coração um Punhal
1971 - Diabólicos Herdeiros
1974 - Macho e Fêmea
1974 - O Supermanso
1975 - Ifigênia Dá Tudo que Tem
1976 - Senhora - Firmina Mascarenhas
1981 - O Homem do Pau-Brasil - Olívia
1982 - Dôra Doralina
1983 - O Rei da Vela  
1992 - As Três Mães 
1995 - A Origem dos Bebês Segundo Kiki Cavalcanti
2002 - Durval Discos - Carmita
2003 - Cristina Wants to Get Married 
2007 - Sete Vidas -  D. Bezinha
2009 - Por um pouco mais de liberdade - Maria
2011 - O Filme dos Espíritos - Dona Maria

Awards
2002 - Cine Pernambuco - Audiovisual Festival || Best Actress || Durval Discos ||  || Won
2009 - I Shows World Largest Film || Best Supporting Actress || For A Little More Freedom ||  || Won

References

External links

1931 births
2018 deaths
Brazilian actresses
Brazilian people of Polish-Jewish descent
Brazilian people of English descent
Brazilian Roman Catholics
Converts to Roman Catholicism from Judaism
Brazilian people of Scottish descent
Brazilian people of Argentine descent